Michael Kevin Malouf  (born 5 November 1953) is an Australian executive, serving as an executive or chief executive officer at various institutions.

Administration career
Malouf most recent tenure was being CEO at VicRoads from 2018 to 4 March 2019. 

He was the CEO of the Carlton Football Club from 2003 until 2007. On 23 March 2007, it was announced that Malouf stepped down as CEO of Carlton and former CEO at the Collingwood Football Club, Greg Swann, would replace Malouf in this position.

He has previously served as chief executive officer of City of Melbourne Council, Australia. Prior to his Melbourne role, Malouf was the chief executive officer of the City of Greater Geelong from 1995 to 1997, and before that held a similar position for the City of Wyndham. He holds a Master of Business Administration from Deakin University, Australia. Malouf has also previously served as the managing director of Barwon Water from 2007 to 2012.

References

1953 births
Living people
Carlton Football Club
Deakin University alumni
Australian chief executives
People educated at St. Bernard's College, Melbourne
Members of the Order of Australia